Georgetown is an unincorporated community and census-designated place (CDP) in McDonough County, Illinois, United States. Its population was 368 as of the 2020 census.

The community is in central McDonough County, on the western border of the city of Macomb, the McDonough county seat. The community is in the valley of the East Fork of the La Moine River.

References

Census-designated places in McDonough County, Illinois
Census-designated places in Illinois